Voia may refer to several villages in Romania:

 Voia, a village in Crângurile Commune, Dâmbovița County
 Voia, a village in Balșa Commune, Hunedoara County